Added Gold (foaled in 1995 in Kentucky) is an American Thoroughbred racehorse. The daughter of Gilded Time is probably best remembered for winning the mile and an eighth Grade II $200,000 Black-Eyed Susan Stakes at Pimlico Race Course on May 15, 1998.

Racing career 

Added Gold won a maiden outing and an allowance race before competing in  the second jewel of the de facto filly Triple Crown, the Grade II $200,000 Black-Eyed Susan Stakes on May 15, 1998. In that mile and an eighth race on the dirt, she Gold beat a field of eight, including stakes winners Tappin Ginger and Hansel's Girl.

Added Gold finished her racing career with four wins and a record of 4-2-1 out of 11 starts with earnings of $222,000.

References 

1995 racehorse births
Thoroughbred family 14-c
Racehorses bred in Kentucky
Racehorses trained in the United States